Sorbas is a municipality of Almería province, in the autonomous community of Andalusia, Spain.

Demographics

References

External links
  Sorbas - The Sorbas Website
  Sorbas - Sistema de Información Multiterritorial de Andalucía
  Sorbas - Diputación Provincial de Almería
 Search Sorbas - Description, information and photographs of Sorbas, Almeria. In English & Spanish
 Natural Area Karst en Yesos de Sorbas

Municipalities in the Province of Almería